Mohamed Traoré may refer to:

Kalilou Traoré (born 1987), Malian footballer who plays in Switzerland
Mohamed Traoré (footballer, born 1988), Malian footballer
Mohamed Traoré (footballer, born 1991), Guinean footballer
Mohamed Traoré (footballer, born 1993), Guinean footballer
Moha Traoré, Spanish footballer
Mohamed Traore (footballer, born 2002), Senegalese footballer